Airways New Zealand (Airways Corporation of New Zealand Limited) is the sole Air Traffic Service provider in New Zealand.

The company was created 1987 as a State-Owned Enterprise having formerly being a division of the Ministry of Transport, a government department. This followed the recommendations of the 1986 Mason-Morris Review. Airways New Zealand is a commercial Air Navigation Service Provider (ANSP), responsible for managing all domestic and international air traffic operating within New Zealand's 30 million square kilometres of airspace over New Zealand, Tonga, Samoa and the Cook Islands. This involves:
 Air Traffic Control, Flight Information, Flight planning and alerting services.
 Navigation Services – the navigation infrastructure and supporting services used by aircraft.
 Communications – Airways operates a sophisticated communications system throughout the country.
 Flight maps
 Flight inspection services

Airways was the world's first ATC provider to operate a fully automated conflict probe with their Oceanic Control System (OCS). It assists controllers' decisions, by predicting possible collisions. This formed the basis of the Lockheed Martin Ocean21 ATC system used by the United States' oceanic centres at Anchorage, Oakland and New York. These systems allow controllers to manage significantly more aircraft than traditional systems because the machine is responsible for detecting any potential future conflicts so the controller can then decide on an action that maintains a safe separation between aircraft.

Airways employs around 350 ATCs, who are based in regional air traffic control towers, military bases and radar centres. Airways is a full member of the Civil Air Navigation Services Organisation (CANSO).

See also

 Civil Aviation Authority of New Zealand
 History of aviation in New Zealand

References

External links
 Airways New Zealand
 Airways New Zealand Locations within New Zealand

Air traffic controller schools
Aviation in New Zealand
Air navigation service providers
Government-owned companies of New Zealand
New Zealand companies established in 1987
Transport companies established in 1987